Singer and songwriter Randy Travis has been honored with many awards and nominations throughout his career in music.

Academy of Country Music Awards

Source:

American Music Awards

Country Music Association Awards

Source:

GMA Dove Awards

Grammy Awards

References

Lists of awards received by American musician